The Taste is a German cooking game show series on Sat.1. It began airing on November 13, 2013.

Judges and Host

Season summary
Colour key
 Team Alexander H.
 Team Frank
 Team Léa
 Team Tim M.
 Team Cornelia
 Team Roland
 Team Maria
 Team Tim R.
 Team Alexander K.

Special

Celebrity Special

Season 1
The first season of The Taste: Celebrity Special began airing on September 10, 2017 and the coaches were, as in the fourth season Alexander Herrmann, Frank Rosin, Cornelia Polletto and Roland Trettl. The host was Christine Henning. The season was won by singer Patrick Lindner.

Season 2
The second celebrity special was aired on September 17, 2017, with the same concept, same coaches, and same name as the first celebrity special. The winner was Evi Sachenbacher-Stehle.

Christmas Special
On December 12, 2018, one week after the sixth season finale, a Christmas special was aired. As in the previous seasons, the coaches were Alexander Herrmann , Frank Rosin , Cornelia Poletto and Roland Trettl . Each coach selected two candidates from his past teams.

References

External links 
 Official website on sat1.de

German television series based on American television series
2013 German television series debuts
Sat.1 original programming
German-language television shows